The dual process model of coping is a model for coping with grief developed by Margaret Stroebe and Henk Schut. They studied grief in their work "The Dual Process Model of Coping with Bereavement: A Decade On". It examines this model of coping and how it could be of benefit compared to others.

The authors came up with a dual process model to represent human grief. They explain coping with bereavement, a state of loss, can be a combination of accepting and confronting it. It informs on how the combination of healthy emotional catharsis and changing perspective can be a good and healthy process to cope. Being able to confront the situation and also deal with everyday life events allows the person to live their lives with desired states of stability in a subjective post-loss world in which bereaved persons find themselves (Parkes, 1993).

Coping
Bereavement and the adjective 'bereaved' are derived from a verb, 'reave', which means "to despoil, rob, or forcibly deprive" according to the Oxford English Dictionary. Thus, a bereaved person is one who has been deprived, robbed, plundered, or stripped of someone or something that they valued. Reaction to this state or impact of loss is called grief. According to Lazarus and Folkman (1984), coping strategies are the "constantly changing cognitive and behavioural efforts to manage specific external and/or internal demands that are appraised as taxing on or exceeding the resources of the person".

People vary in the ways they grieve and in the ways they cope. But acknowledging it and allowing themselves to go through the motions will allow them to cope in a healthy way. To cope with the loss, the person requires to relearn the world around them and simultaneously make a multifaceted transition from loving in presence to loving in absence (Attig, 2001). A healthy relocation of the deceased internally and maintaining a healthy dynamic connectedness/relationship is observed to provide solace to the grieving, but the weightage differed in pluralistic cultural settings. Grievers will go through times of extreme sadness and also times where they are numb to what has happened.

Lack of appropriate coping can bring many ailments to a person, mental and physical. Coping through mourning in a state of bereavement is advised in the Bible as "Blessed are those who mourn, for they will be comforted." Because it helps to achieve growth through thorough acceptance of loss, the transforming capacity of profound human experiences. Freud, in 1959, in an article, called this a process of "working through" the grief. Healthy coping is achieved when the bereaved person is enabled to go forward with healthy, productive living by effortfully developing "new normals" to guide that living which is characterized by lesser stressful demands compared to the initial phase of grief.

Greenblatt has reviewed spousal mourning as being essential for transition. He describes four phases of mourning: the initial reaction of shock, numbness, denial and disbelief; followed by pining, yearning, depression then in a healthy environment resolution phase begins with emancipation from the loved one and readjustment to the new environment.

Dual process model

Loss oriented
The loss oriented process focuses on coping with bereavement, the loss itself, recognizing it and accepting it. In this process a person will express feelings of grief with all the losses that occur from losing their loved one. There will be many changes from work to family and friendships. There might also be demographic changes and even economic ones. During this time, people either acknowledge these changes head on or ruminate on feelings of loss which might lead to distorted, complicated or prolonged grief.

The loss oriented process will bring on a lot of yearning, irritability, despair, anxiety and depression. During this process they are only concentrated on their pain that this loss has caused. Lack or denial of early adaptive acknowledgement that they will no longer speak to deceased or see them again might instigate compulsive and self-destructive behaviors. People attached with the deceased have to reconfigure their identity as an autonomous being. These processes in a non-resilient griever can appear overwhelming, and associated guilt can be exported over friends and family in an assumptive effort which might affect interpersonal relationships.

In the context of disaster related losses or anticipated losses, such as climate change related losses, there is evidence that engaging with these emotional experiences in order to make meaning of them is a necessary step. Research indicates that without this process of reflecting on emotional experiences, it is not possible to transform them into more adaptive expressions, leading to poor mental health.

Restoration oriented
In restoration-oriented process, the loss of the loved one is accepted and attachments with the deceased are relinquished. These include focusing on the new roles in their post loss reality and responsibilities in lives. The restoration-oriented process incorporates endurance through reconstruction of perspective by taking over grief; grieving thoughts are adjusted adaptively by creating new meanings with the deceased.

The restoration process is a confrontation process that allows the person to adjust to a world without the deceased. People in this process can feel subjective oscillations of pride and grief related stressors in the avoidance mentalization. This process allows the person to live their daily life as a changed individual without being consumed by the grieving they are facing. William Worden calls this the four tasks of grief. Therese A. Rando calls the letting go process as emancipation from bondage due to the strength required for change and recovery.

Again, in the context of disaster related losses or anticipated losses due to climate change, the process of reflecting on and making meaning of emotional experiences leads to growth in resilience, psychological flexibility, increased community engagement and greater solidarity. It is the emotional processing component of this grief that supports the action and restoration that occurs in responses to these losses.

Conclusion
The dual process model of coping takes into consideration that everyone will have stressful life events while they are coping with bereavement. Their lives will continue and so will the problems associated with it. There will be many situations that will take them away from grieving. These situations can either benefit them or affect them negatively if they allow them to. Being aware and prepared to change can allow them to continue and deal with post-loss life events.

See also
 Death anxiety
 Survivor guilt
 Terminal respiratory secretions

References

Further reading

 
 
 

Grief
Counseling